Harbourfront may refer to the following places:

Harbourfront, Toronto, Canada
Harbourfront Centre
HarbourFront (Singapore)
HarbourFront Centre
HarbourFront MRT station
Central Harbourfront, Hong Kong

See also